The duck-billed golden-line fish (Sinocyclocheilus anatirostris) is a species of cyprinid. It is found only in China.

References

duck-billed golden-line fish
Cave fish
Endemic fauna of Guangxi
Taxa named by Lin Ren-Duan
Taxa named by Luo Zhi-Fa
duck-billed golden-line fish
Taxonomy articles created by Polbot